María Pérez García (born 29 April 1996) is a Spanish race walker who competes for Spain internationally. She has qualified to represent Spain at the 2020 Summer Olympics in the women's 20 km walk event.

Competition record

References

External links
 
 
 
 

1996 births
Living people
Spanish female racewalkers
Olympic athletes of Spain
Athletes (track and field) at the 2020 Summer Olympics
World Athletics Championships athletes for Spain
Spanish Athletics Championships winners
Sportspeople from the Province of Granada
20th-century Spanish women
21st-century Spanish women